Francisco Mba Nzang (born 14 February 1989), known as Frank Mba, is an Equatoguinean basketball player who plays as a point guard for Vírgen María de África and the Equatorial Guinea national team. He also holds Spanish citizenship.

Club career
Mba has been at the youth ranks of Real Madrid Baloncesto and Baloncesto Fuenlabrada. In 2013, he joined Malabo Kings in Equatorial Guinea.

International career
Mba has joined the Equatorial Guinea men's national basketball team in January 2020. He is a former youth international player for Spain.

References 

1989 births
Living people
Equatoguinean emigrants to Spain
Equatoguinean men's basketball players
Basketball players from the Community of Madrid
Naturalised citizens of Spain
People from Wele-Nzas
Point guards
Spanish men's basketball players